Luis Anthony Alegría Quijón (born 21 November 1980) was a Chilean footballer. His last club was Deportes Concepción.

External links
 
 

1980 births
Living people
Chilean footballers
Primera B de Chile players
Chilean Primera División players
Universidad de Concepción footballers
Ñublense footballers
Cobresal footballers
Everton de Viña del Mar footballers
Deportes Concepción (Chile) footballers
C.D. Antofagasta footballers
San Marcos de Arica footballers
Association football defenders